Belfaux-Village railway station is a railway station in the municipality of Belfaux, in the Swiss canton of Fribourg. It is an intermediate stop on the standard gauge Fribourg–Ins line of Transports publics Fribourgeois.

Services
 the following services stop at Belfaux-Village:

 RER Fribourg  / :

References

External links 
 
 

Railway stations in the canton of Fribourg
Transports publics Fribourgeois stations